Sănătăuca is a village in Florești District, Moldova.

References

External links 

Villages of Florești District
Populated places on the Dniester